Mariza Koch (born 14 March 1944) is a Greek folk music singer who has recorded many albums since starting her career in 1971. On the wider stage she is best remembered for representing her homeland at the Eurovision Song Contest 1976 with the song Panayia Mou, Panayia Mou.

Early life
Mariza Koch was born in Athens in 1944 but lived in her mother's hometown in Santorini from a young age. Her father was German.

Career
Koch began her musical career in 1971 with an album titled Arabas. It consisted of a collection of traditional Greek folk songs blended with unusual beats from traditional and modern electronic instrumental sounds. 

Her unique vocals became the center piece of the music which on more than one occasion needed no accompaniment. No matter what one called it, the album was a resounding success. More albums followed with the sound eventually mellowing back into the original folk sounds of the past, where traditional instruments are used in their entirety. 

Koch's most recent album included elements of traditional Greek music and Jazz Fusion. On March 14, 2010, Alpha TV ranked Koch the 29th top-certified female artist in the nation's phonographic era (since 1960).

Discography
1971 "Αραμπάς" Arabas (Cart), the first Golden Disc in the history of Greek music
1973 "Μια στο καρφί και μια στο πέταλο" Mia sto karfi ke mia sto petalo (One blow at the nail and one at the horseshoe)
1974 "Η Μαρίζα Κωχ και δυο ζυγιές παιχνίδια" I Mariza Koch ke dio zygies pechnidia (Mariza Koch and two pounds of toys)
1976 "Παναγιά μου Παναγιά μου" Panagia mou , Panagia mou (My Holy Mother, my Holy Mother)
1976 "Άσε με να ταξιδέψω" Ase me na taksidepso (Let me travel)
1977 "Μαρίζα Κωχ" Mariza Koch
1978 "Μια εκδρομή με τη Μαρίζα" Mia ekdromi me tin Mariza (A trip with Mariza)
1978 "Ένα περιβόλι γεμάτο τραγούδια" Ena periboli gemato tragoudia (A garden full of songs)
1979 "Αιγαίο 1" Egeo 1 (Aegean 1)
1979 "Αιγαίο 2" Egeo 2 (Aegean 2)
1980 "Ο Καθρέφτης" O kathreptis (The Mirror)
1982 "Στο βάθος κήπος" Sto vathos kipos (Garden in the Back)
1986 "Τα παράλια" Ta paralia (The beach songs)
1988 "Εθνική Οδός" Ethniki Odos (National Road)
1990 "Οι δρόμοι του μικρού Αλέξανδρου" I dromi tou mikrou Alexandrou (The roads of little Alexander)
1992 "Διπλή Βάρδια" Dipli Vardia (Double guard duty)
 "Η γοργόνα ταξιδεύει τον μικρό Αλέξανδρο" I gorgona taxidevi ton mikro Alexandro
 "Μια εκδρομή με τις εννέα μούσες" Mia ekdromi me tis ennea mouses (A trip with the nine muses)
 "Σαν ουράνιο τόξο" San ouranio toxo (Like a Rainbow)
 "Να τα πούμε" Na ta pume (Let's say it)
 "Μια γιορτή με τη Μαρίζα" Mia giorti me tin Mariza (A celebration with Mariza)
 "Τα χρωματιστά τραγούδια" Ta chromatista tragoudia (The coloured songs)
2002 "Διπλή Βάρδια" Dipli Vardia (Double guard duty)
2003 "Φάτα μοργκάνα" (Fata morgana)
2004 "Ραντεβού στην Αθήνα" Randevou stin Athina (Rendezvous in Athens)
2004 "Πνοή του Αιγαίου" Pnoi tu Egeou (Breath of Aegean)
 "Σ΄ αυτή την πόλη" S'avti tin poli (In this city)
 "Το τροπάριο της Κασσιανής" To tropario tis Kassianis (The hymn of Cassiane)
 "Τα παράλια" Ta paralia (The beach songs)
2009 "Πάνω στη Θάλασσα εγώ τραγουδώ" Pano sti Thalassa ego tragoudo'' (Above the sea I'm singing)

See also
Arleta
Keti Chomata
Rena Koumioti

References

1944 births
Eurovision Song Contest entrants of 1976
Greek entehno singers
Greek folk singers
Eurovision Song Contest entrants for Greece
20th-century Greek women singers
Greek people of German descent
Living people
People from Santorini
Singers from Athens